Nelliady is a town in Jaffna District, Sri Lanka. This is the one of the busiest towns in Jaffna district.

After many coastal areas of Sri Lanka were devastated by the 2004 Indian Ocean earthquake and tsunami many people settled further inland, in towns including Nelliady.

Main Spots 

 Nelliady Public Market
 Nelliady Bus Stand
 Karaveddy Main Post Office
 Karaveddy Divisional Hospital

Education
Schools in or near Nelliady  include Nelliady Madhya Maha Vidyalayam (Nelliady Central College), Sacred Heart College, Vigneswara College, Uduppiddy American Mission College and Gnanasariyar College.

Religion
Tadangan Puliyadi Murugan Temple 
Pillayar Temple
Kali Temple
Gnana Vairavar Temple
Kalayan Thoddam Sri Muththu Kumarasuvami 
St.Antony's Church 

Towns in Jaffna District
Vadamarachchi South West DS Division